Alois Benjamin Saliger (June 30, 1880 – April 1969) was a New York City inventor and businessman.  In 1927 he invented the Psycho-Phone.

Biography
He was born on June 30, 1880, in Bartošovice v Orlických horách in what is now the Czech Republic to Marie and Frank Saliger.

He was the owner of the Saliger Ship Salvage Company in New York and was charged with stock fraud in 1919.

In 1927 he invented the Psycho-Phone for sleep learning: "It has been proven that natural sleep is identical with hypnotic sleep and that during natural sleep the unconscious mind is most receptive to suggestions." He died in April 1969.

References

1880 births
1969 deaths
Austro-Hungarian emigrants to the United States
20th-century American inventors